Megacraspedus multispinella is a moth of the family Gelechiidae. It is found in Russia (the southern Ural). The habitat consists of rocky steppe slopes with lush low vegetation.

The wingspan is 11.5–13 mm. The ground colour of the forewings is white with evenly scattered dark brown tipped scales. The hindwings are grey.

Etymology
The species name refers to the numerous minute spines in the aedeagus in the male genitalia.

References

Moths described in 2010
Megacraspedus